Liu Limin (born March 27, 1976) is a former swimmer from China who won the silver medal in the 100 m butterfly at the 1996 Summer Olympics in Atlanta, Georgia.  She attended college at the University of Nevada, Reno in the United States.  She was inducted into the university's athletic hall of fame in 2010.  Limin Liu won three NCAA individual championships during her career, winning the 200 m butterfly at the NCAA Championships in 1999 and the 100 m and 200 m fly in 2000.  She holds school and Big West Conference records in the 100 m and 200 m fly.  A three-time All-American, Liu was named the Big West Swimmer of the Year in 2000.

External links
 
 University of Nevada, Reno profile

1976 births
Living people
Chinese female butterfly swimmers
Olympic silver medalists for China
Olympic swimmers of China
Swimmers at the 1996 Summer Olympics
Swimmers at the 2000 Summer Olympics
World record setters in swimming
World Aquatics Championships medalists in swimming
Nevada Wolf Pack women's swimmers
Medalists at the FINA World Swimming Championships (25 m)
Asian Games medalists in swimming
Medalists at the 1996 Summer Olympics
Olympic silver medalists in swimming
Universiade medalists in swimming
Asian Games gold medalists for China
Swimmers at the 1994 Asian Games
Medalists at the 1994 Asian Games
Universiade gold medalists for China
Universiade silver medalists for China
Medalists at the 1995 Summer Universiade
20th-century Chinese women